"Me and You Versus the World" is a third single by Liverpool-based band Space. It was the band's first Top 10 hit and peaked at #9 on the UK singles chart in September 1996. It is from their debut album Spiders.

Track listing

 CD1 CDGUT4
"Me and You Versus the World (Radio Edit)"
"Me and You Versus the World (Knickers Mix)"
"Me and You Versus the World (No Knickers Mix)"
"Me and You Versus the World (Crotchless Knickers Mix)"

 CD2 CDGUT4
"Me and You Versus the World"
"Spiders"
"Life of a Miser"
"Blow Your Cover"

Cassette CAGUT4
"Me and You Versus the World (Radio Edit)"
"Spiders"

References

External links 
"Me and You Versus the World" article

Space (English band) songs
1996 singles
1996 songs